Sumbaran is a Marathi movie released on 19 November 2009. Produced by Anil Phatdare and directed by Gajendra Ahire.

Cast 

Makarand Anaspure as Vasant
Jeetendra Joshi as Veeru
Mukta Barve as Kalyani
The cast includes Seema Deshmukh, Makarand Anaspure, Vrinda Ahire, Jeetendra Joshi, Mukta Barve, Siddharth Jadhav, Sai Tamhankar, Ashwini Kalsekar, Ravindra Mankani Ravi Kale and Jayant Savarkar.

Soundtrack
The music is provided by Rahul Ranade.
 Dongarachya Potamadhe - Shaan, Janvi Arora
 Punvechya Chandnyat - Nandesh Umap
 Rutu Yetil Jatil - Shaan, Janvi Arora
 Punvechya Chandnyat Jazz - Ajit Parab
 Deva Tuzhe Sumbaran - Nandesh Umap

References

External links 
 
 ‘Sumbaran’ review: Turns out quite memorable.... - sakaaltimes.com

2009 films
2000s Marathi-language films
Films directed by Gajendra Ahire